Giuseppe Stancampiano (born in Palermo, 9 January 1987) is an Italian footballer who plays as a goalkeeper for  club Pontedera.

Club career
On 9 July 2021, he signed a two-year contract with Catania. On 9 April 2022, he was released together with all of his Catania teammates following the club's exclusion from Italian football due to its inability to overcome a number of financial issues.

References

1987 births
Footballers from Palermo
Living people
Association football goalkeepers
Italian footballers
Latina Calcio 1932 players
Cádiz CF B players
U.S.D. Sestri Levante 1919 players
Imolese Calcio 1919 players
A.C. Cuneo 1905 players
Trapani Calcio players
U.S. Livorno 1915 players
Catania S.S.D. players
U.S. Città di Pontedera players
Serie C players
Serie D players
Eccellenza players
Italian expatriate footballers
Expatriate footballers in Spain
Italian expatriate sportspeople in Spain